Gabriel Félix dos Santos (born 4 April 1995) is a Brazilian footballer who plays as a goalkeeper for São Luiz borrowed by Camboriú.

Career statistics

Club

Notes

References

1995 births
Living people
Brazilian footballers
Brazilian expatriate footballers
Association football goalkeepers
Campeonato Brasileiro Série A players
Campeonato Brasileiro Série B players
Goiás Esporte Clube players
CR Vasco da Gama players
Fortaleza Esporte Clube players
Esporte Clube São Bento players
Austin Bold FC players
Luverdense Esporte Clube players
Camboriú Futebol Clube players
Brazilian expatriate sportspeople in the United States
Expatriate soccer players in the United States